Nushrratt Bharuccha (born Nushrat Bharucha; 17 May 1985) is an Indian actress who works in Hindi cinema. She has appeared in films like Love Sex Aur Dhokha, Pyaar Ka Punchnama, Pyaar Ka Punchnama 2, Sonu Ke Titu Ki Sweety, Dream Girl, Chhorii, Ajeeb Daastaans and Janhit Mein Jaari.

Early life 
Nushrat Bharucha was born on 17 May 1985 in a Dawoodi Bohra family of Mumbai. She is the only child of her father Tanvir Bharucha, a businessman and her mother Tasneem Bharucha, a housewife.
Nushrat has graduated with a degree in Fine Arts from Jai Hind College in Mumbai.

Career

2002–2014: Early career and struggles
Bharuccha made her acting debut with a minor role in the 2002 television series Kittie Party. She got her first Hindi film with Jai Santoshi Maa (2006) and did the music video "Zindagi Kahin Gum Hai" by Zubeen Garg in 2007. She had a cameo in Kal Kissne Dekha (2009) and did the Telugu film Taj Mahal (2010). Her final television role occurred in Seven as Drishika Kashyap.

Bharuccha had her first leading role in Hindi films with Dibakar Banerjee and Ekta Kapoor's anthology Love Sex Aur Dhokha (2010), that did moderately well. She next starred opposite Kartik Aaryan in Luv Ranjan's directorials Pyaar Ka Punchnama (2011) and Akaash Vani (2013), both of which underperformed, as like her next disaster Darr @ the Mall (2014) with Jimmy Sheirgill.

2015–present: Breakthrough
Bharuccha rose to success by appearing with Aaryan for the third time in Ranjan's Pyaar Ka Punchnama 2 (2015). The film turned out to be her first commercial hit, earning over 88 crore worldwide. However, her other release Meeruthiya Gangsters (2015) and the Tamil film Valeba Raja (2016) underperformed.

In 2018, she came into huge limelight for portraying a grey shaded character opposite Aaryan and Sunny Nijjar in Ranjan and Bhushan Kumar's romcom Sonu Ke Titu Ki Sweety. It proved to be a surprise blockbuster at the box-office, earning 150 crores worldwide. She retained this widespread success with Kapoor, Bhushan Kumar and Raaj Shaandilyaa's 200 crores-grossing comedy Dream Girl (2019), where she played Ayushmann Khurrana's love interest. Both Sonu Ke Titu Ki Sweety and Dream Girl entered the 100 Crore Club in India and rank among her highest grossing releases.

Also in 2019, Bharuccha performed an item number "Peeyo Datt Ke" alongside Sidharth Malhotra in the Milap Zaveri and Bhushan Kumar's romantic thriller Marjaavaan which was sung by Yo Yo Honey Singh. She starred in two music videos, Atif Aslam's "Baarishein" and Guru Randhawa's "Ishq Tera".

Due to the COVID-19 pandemic in India that led long closure of theatres, Bharuccha's next sports film Chhalaang (2020) directed by Hansal Mehta and produced by Bhushan Kumar and Ajay Devgn, was directly released on OTT platform Amazon Prime Video. She played Rajkummar Rao's ladylove in the film that met with mixed reviews.

In 2021, she headlined Yo Yo Honey Singh's music video "Saiyaan Ji" and featured in two OTT films. Firstly she was seen in Karan Johar and Raj Mehta's Netflix anthology film Ajeeb Daastaans and then in Vishal Furia and Bhushan Kumar's Amazon Prime horror film Chhorii, both of which earned her critical praise for her acting. Chhorii marked her first film as a solo female-centric character.

The following year, Bharuccha appeared firstly in the love triangle Hurdang (2022) alongside Sunny Kaushal and Vijay Varma. A huge box office failure, it was directed by Nikhil Nagesh Tiwari and produced by Bhushan Kumar. That year, she also earned critical praise for appearing in the female-centric social comedy Janhit Mein Jaari.

Upcoming films

She featured in the historical drama Ram Setu with Akshay Kumar and Jacqueline Fernandez, which released on Diwali 2022. This will be followed by Chhorii 2, a sequel to Chhorii. She will also team up with Akshay Kumar, Diana Penty and Emraan Hashmi in Johar and Mehta's 2023 comedy Selfiee.

Personal life
In June 2020, Bharucha changed the spelling of her name to Nushrratt Bharuccha, due to numerological reasons.

Filmography

Films

All films are in Hindi unless otherwise noted.

Music videos

Television

Awards and nominations

References

External links

 
 
 

Indian television actresses
Living people
Gujarati people
Actresses from Mumbai
Dawoodi Bohras
Indian Ismailis
Actresses in Telugu cinema
1985 births
Actresses in Hindi cinema
21st-century Indian actresses
Actresses in Hindi television
Indian film actresses